Batnae (or Batnæ) may refer to :

 the Ancient city and former bishopric is Osroene, now Suruç in Asian Turkey; 
 and hence, two Catholic titular successor sees :
 Batnae (Roman), Latin Catholic
 Batnae (Syrian), Syriac Catholic